

Highest-grossing films

List of films
A list of films released in Japan in 2001 (see 2001 in film).

See also 
 2001 in Japan
 2001 in Japanese television

References

Footnotes

Sources

External links
 Japanese films of 2001 at the Internet Movie Database

2001
Japanese
Films